Goorawin is a rural locality and the site of a discontinued railway station and siding in the central northern part of the Riverina.  It is situated by rail, about 7 kilometres south of Langtree and 12 kilometres north of Merriwagga.

Notes and references

Towns in the Riverina
Towns in New South Wales